Pterotaenia is a genus of picture-winged flies in the family Ulidiidae.

Species
Pterotaenia angustifasciata Malloch, 1933
Pterotaenia edwardsi Malloch, 1933
Pterotaenia fasciata (Wiedemann, 1830)
Pterotaenia peruana Malloch, 1933
Pterotaenia rivelloides (Blanchard, 1967)

References

Ulidiidae
Brachycera genera
Diptera of South America
Taxa named by Camillo Rondani